Micropterix imperfectella is a species of moth belonging to the family Micropterigidae. It was described by Staudinger in 1859. It is known from Spain.

References

External links
lepiforum.de

Micropterigidae
Moths described in 1920
Endemic fauna of Spain
Moths of Europe
Taxa named by Otto Staudinger